The 2007 Kerrick Sports Sedan Series was an Australian motor racing series which was recognised by the Confederation of Australian Motor Sport as a National Series. It was the seventeenth running of a national series for Sports Sedans in Australia. It began on 22 April 2007 at Oran Park Raceway and ended on 9 December at Sandown Raceway after fifteen races.

The series was won by Tony Ricciardello driving an Alfa Romeo Alfetta GTV.

Teams and drivers

The following drivers competed in the 2007 Kerrick Sports Sedan Series.

Race calendar
The 2007 Kerrick Sports Sedan Series was contested over five rounds. The series comprised fifteen races, at five race meetings, held in four different states.

Points system
Points were awarded 20-17-15-13-12-11-10-9-8-7-6-5-4-3-2 based on the top fifteen race positions in each race. All other classified finishers will be awarded one point. Two points were awarded for first place in Qualifying.

Series standings

* No points were scored after the race was declared with insufficient laps completed after a crash by Jordan Roddy caused the race to be red flagged.
** Race was cancelled after race schedule overran.

References

External links
 Official series website
 2007 Racing Results Archive 

National Sports Sedan Series
Sports Sedans